Wayne Cornelius is a U.S. scholar of comparative immigration policy and Mexican politics and development. He received his B.A. in Political Science from the College of Wooster in Wooster, Ohio in 1967.  Cornelius founded the Center for U.S.-Mexican Studies at the University of California, San Diego in 1979, and directed it from 1979–1994 and 2001-2003. He was also the founding director of UCSD's Center for Comparative Immigration Studies, established in 1999. Cornelius is also a Past President of the Latin American Studies Association.  Cornelius has also been a Research Fellow of the Institute for the Study of Labor (Bonn, Germany), the Woodrow Wilson International Center for Scholars, and a member of the Council on Foreign Relations (New York).

Professional career

Cornelius taught at the Massachusetts Institute of Technology from 1971-1979, at the University of California-San Diego from 1979 to 2015, and at Oxford University in 1992 and 1994. Since 2018 he has been Visiting Professor of Political Science at Reed College and Visiting Professor of Sociology at Portland State University, both in Portland, Oregon. He remains actively engaged in research, policy advising, and lecturing on immigration policy issues.

Research
Cornelius' main expertise is on Mexico and Mexican and Central American migration to the U.S., Latin American migration to Japan and Spain, the Mexican political system and justice system, and measuring the efficacy of immigration control policies pursued by the United States and other countries of immigration. He has done field research in the United States, Mexico, Cuba, Spain, and Japan. His research has been supported by the National Science Foundation, the National Institute for Child Health and Human Development, the National Research Council, the Inter-American Development Bank, the United Nations, the Ford, Tinker, and Rockefeller foundations, and Fundación BBVA (Spain).

Selected publications

 Four Generations of Norteños: New Research from the Cradle of Mexican Migration. CCIS/Lynne Rienner Publishers, 2008.  (cloth),  (paper)
 
 Reforming the Administration of Justice in Mexico. University of Notre Dame Press, 2007.  (cloth),
 (paper).
 Mayan Journeys: The New Migration from Yucatán to the United States. CCIS-UCSD/Lynne Rienner Publishers, 2007.  (cloth),  (paper).
 Impacts of Border Enforcement on Mexican Migration: The View from Sending Communities. CCIS/Lynne Rienner Publishers, 2007.   (cloth),  (paper).
 Controlling Immigration: A Global Perspective, 2nd ed., Stanford University Press, 2004.  (paper).
 The New Face of Mexican Migration. CCIS-UCSD, 2016. (paper). 
 "Politics in Mexico," in Comparative Politics Today: A World View, 12th ed. Pearson, 2018.  (paper).

References

Living people
College of Wooster alumni
American political scientists
Stanford University alumni
University of California, San Diego faculty
1945 births